"McCafferty" is an Irish folk song.

McCafferty may also refer to:

McCafferty (band)
McCafferty (surname)
McCafferty Spur, a geographical feature in the Cook Mountains, Antarctica
Elizabeth McCafferty Three-Decker, house in Worcester, Massachusetts
McCafferty's Coaches, a former interstate bus company that merged with Greyhound Australia in 2004.

See also
McCaffery